Magda is a 1917 American silent drama film directed by Emile Chautard and starring Clara Kimball Young, Alice Gale, and Valda Valkyrien. It is based on the play Heimat by Hermann Sudermann.

Cast

References

Bibliography
 Donald W. McCaffrey & Christopher P. Jacobs. Guide to the Silent Years of American Cinema. Greenwood Publishing, 1999.

External links
 

1917 films
1917 drama films
1910s English-language films
American silent feature films
Silent American drama films
Films directed by Emile Chautard
American black-and-white films
Selznick Pictures films
1917 lost films
Lost drama films
Films based on works by Hermann Sudermann
American films based on plays
1910s American films